Stephan Lämmermann (born 10 July 1967) is a German former professional footballer who played as a forward.

References

1967 births
Living people
Sportspeople from Hamm
German footballers
Footballers from North Rhine-Westphalia
Association football forwards
2. Bundesliga players
Alemannia Aachen players